Mapei Stadium – Città del Tricolore (with the first half officially written in all caps) is a multi-purpose stadium in Reggio Emilia, Italy. It is currently the home ground of U.S. Sassuolo of Serie A and A.C. Reggiana of Serie C.

The stadium holds 21,525 and was built in 1995, replacing the Stadio Mirabello. It was given the name Stadio Città del Tricolore on 11 March 2012, having previously been called the Stadio Giglio. On 8 July 2013, the stadium was given the current denomination for ownership reason (acquired by Mapei from the comune of Reggio Emilia).

On 20 November 2020 it was announced that the stadium would host the 2020 Supercoppa Italiana between Juventus and Napoli,  while on 2 April 2021 it was announced that the stadium would host the 2021 Coppa Italia Final between Atalanta and Juventus.

History 
The need for a new stadium in Reggio Emilia started when Reggiana gained promotion to Serie A in 1993: the club launched multi-year season tickets in order to raise money to build a new stadium of its property. The stadium was opened in 1995 with a sold-out match between Reggiana and Juventus. In the aftermath of Reggiana's dissolution and reconstitution in 2005, the club lost the property of the stadium, which was assigned to the Tribunal of Reggio Emilia.

The reconstituted Reggiana continued to play in the stadium and had its headquarters and its historical museum located in the Main Stand; in the same years the shopping mall "I Petali" was built behind the Away End and the East Stand, with a good range of shops, cinemas, gyms and restaurants. Stadio Giglio was renamed by the Municipality "Città del Tricolore", referring to the creation of the Italian Tricolour in Reggio Emilia in 1797.

The stadium is unique in that there is a water-filled moat built between the pitch and the stands to try to prevent pitch invasions. Because the water is supplied from a nearby river, there have even been cases in which bored fans have been seen successfully fishing in it.

In 2013, the Tribunal hosted a public auction for the property of the stadium, which was won by the ceramic industry MAPEI, owned by former Confindustria president Giorgio Squinzi, which also owned U.S. Sassuolo Calcio, promoted to Serie A at the end of the 2012–13 season. The stadium was then renamed "MAPEI Stadium" due to sponsorship reasons.<ref>{{Cite web |url=http://www.gazzetta.it/Calcio/Squadre/Sassuolo/notizie/24-06-2013/sassulo-trofeo-tim-juve-milan-20647501610.shtml |title="/> 

Sassuolo's move and MAPEI's acquisition and subsequent renaming of the stadium has caused much outrage from supporters of Reggiana. The protests included demonstrations at the 2015 TIM Trophy and during some Sassuolo's Serie A games and the formation of a group called "Via il Sassuolo da Reggio Emilia" (Sassuolo out of Reggio Emilia), but also marches through the city centre to raise the attention on the topic. In June 2016 a group of Reggiana ultras attended the Campionato Primavera held in the stadium between Roma and Juventus and protested against the stadium’s ownership. In September 2016, Luca Vecchi, Mayor of Reggio Emilia, was heavily booed by the fans during the club's presentation due to the Municipality position on the dispute.

Events 
It is currently used mostly for football matches and is the home ground of Reggiana. It also hosts larger rugby union matches for the United Rugby Championship team Zebre of Parma.

Football club Carpi used the ground for home matches during the 2011–12 season. In the 2013–14 season, the promoted Serie A side, Sassuolo, played at the ground. They signed a two-year rent deal with Reggiana, which manages the venue. The agreement struck with Reggiana also included infrastructural improvements, including new benches and locker rooms, along with the development of new marketing and trade policies, which aimed to take advantage of the business opportunities that come with the club's Serie A promotion. The stadium was consequently renamed Mapei Stadium – Città del Tricolore.

The stadium hosted the 2016 UEFA Women's Champions League Final.

References

External links 

Stadium information
Mapei purchase the stadium
Stadium Journey Article

Stadium
Citta del Tricolore
Multi-purpose stadiums in Italy
Sports venues in Emilia-Romagna
Sports venues completed in 1995
Zebre Parma
Citta del Tricolore